Jörn Gevert (16 March 1929 – September 2017) was a Chilean hurdler. He competed in the men's 110 metres hurdles at the 1952 Summer Olympics.

References

External links
 

1929 births
2017 deaths
Athletes (track and field) at the 1952 Summer Olympics
Chilean male hurdlers
Olympic athletes of Chile
Athletes (track and field) at the 1951 Pan American Games
Pan American Games medalists in athletics (track and field)
Pan American Games silver medalists for Chile
Medalists at the 1951 Pan American Games
20th-century Chilean people
21st-century Chilean people